Hamlet is a 1996 film adaptation of William Shakespeare's play Hamlet, adapted and directed by Kenneth Branagh, who also stars as Prince Hamlet. The film also features Derek Jacobi as King Claudius, Julie Christie as Queen Gertrude, Kate Winslet as Ophelia, Michael Maloney as Laertes, Richard Briers as Polonius, and Nicholas Farrell as Horatio. Other cast members include Robin Williams, Gérard Depardieu, Jack Lemmon, Billy Crystal, Rufus Sewell, Charlton Heston, Richard Attenborough, Judi Dench, John Gielgud, and Ken Dodd.

The film is the first unabridged theatrical film version of Hamlet, running just over four hours. The setting is updated to the 19th century, but its Elizabethan English text remains the same. Blenheim Palace is the setting used for the exterior grounds of Elsinore Castle and interiors were all photographed at Shepperton Studios. Hamlet was also the last major dramatic motion picture to be filmed entirely on 70 mm film until 2011, with the release of the documentary Samsara.

Hamlet has been regarded as one of the best Shakespeare film adaptations ever made. However, it was not a box office success, mostly due to its limited release, grossing just under $5 million on a budget of $18 million. The film received four Oscar nominations for the 69th Academy Awards for Best Art Direction (Tim Harvey), Best Costume Design (Alexandra Byrne), Best Original Score (Patrick Doyle), and Best Writing (Adapted Screenplay) (Kenneth Branagh).

Plot

Prince Hamlet of Denmark, is the son of the recently deceased King Hamlet, and nephew of King Claudius, his father's brother and successor. Claudius hastily married King Hamlet's widow, Gertrude, Hamlet's mother, and took the throne for himself. Denmark has a long-standing feud with neighbouring Norway, in which King Hamlet slew King Fortinbras of Norway in a battle some years ago. Although Denmark defeated Norway and the Norwegian throne fell to King Fortinbras's infirm brother, Denmark fears that an invasion led by the dead Norwegian king's son, Prince Fortinbras, is imminent.

On a cold night on the ramparts of Elsinore, the Danish royal castle, the sentries Bernardo and Marcellus discuss a ghost resembling the late King Hamlet which they have recently seen, and bring Prince Hamlet's friend Horatio as a witness. After the ghost appears again, the three vow to tell Prince Hamlet what they have witnessed.

As the court gathers the next day, while King Claudius and Queen Gertrude discuss affairs of state with their elderly adviser Polonius, Hamlet looks on glumly. During the court, Claudius grants permission for Polonius's son Laertes to return to school in France and sends envoys to inform the King of Norway about Fortinbras. Claudius also scolds Hamlet for continuing to grieve over his father and forbids him to return to his schooling in Wittenberg. After the court exits, Hamlet despairs of his father's death and his mother's hasty remarriage. Learning of the ghost from Horatio, Hamlet resolves to see it himself.

As Polonius's son Laertes prepares to depart for a visit to France, Polonius offers him advice that culminates in the maxim "to thine own self be true." Polonius's daughter, Ophelia, admits her interest in Hamlet, but Laertes warns her against seeking the prince's attention, and Polonius orders her to reject his advances. That night on the rampart, the ghost appears to Hamlet, telling the prince that he was murdered by Claudius and demanding that Hamlet avenge him. Hamlet agrees, and the ghost vanishes. The prince confides to Horatio and the sentries that from now on he plans to "put an antic disposition on", or act as though he has gone mad, and forces them to swear to keep his plans for revenge secret; however, he remains uncertain of the ghost's reliability.

Soon thereafter, Ophelia rushes to her father, telling him that Hamlet arrived at her door the prior night half-undressed and behaving erratically. Polonius blames love for Hamlet's madness and resolves to inform Claudius and Gertrude. As he enters to do so, the King and Queen finish welcoming Rosencrantz and Guildenstern, two student acquaintances of Hamlet, to Elsinore. The royal couple has requested that the students investigate the cause of Hamlet's mood and behaviour. Additional news requires that Polonius wait to be heard: messengers from Norway inform Claudius that the King of Norway has rebuked Prince Fortinbras for attempting to re-fight his father's battles. The forces that Fortinbras had conscripted to march against Denmark will instead be sent against Poland, though they will pass through Danish territory to get there.

Polonius tells Claudius and Gertrude his theory regarding Hamlet's behaviour and speaks to Hamlet in a hall of the castle to try to uncover more information. Hamlet feigns madness and subtly insults Polonius all the while. When Rosencrantz and Guildenstern arrive, Hamlet greets his "friends" warmly but quickly discerns that they are spies. Hamlet admits that he is upset at his situation but refuses to give the true reason, instead of commenting on "What a piece of work is a man". Rosencrantz and Guildenstern tell Hamlet that they have brought along a troupe of actors that they met while travelling to Elsinore. Hamlet, after welcoming the actors and dismissing his friends-turned-spies, asks them to deliver a soliloquy about the death of King Priam and Queen Hecuba at the climax of the Trojan War. Impressed by their delivery of the speech, he plots to stage The Murder of Gonzago, a play featuring a death in the style of his father's murder, and to determine the truth of the ghost's story, as well as Claudius's guilt or innocence, by studying Claudius's reaction.

Polonius forces Ophelia to return Hamlet's love letters and tokens of affection to the prince while he and Claudius watch from afar to evaluate Hamlet's reaction. Hamlet is walking alone in the hall as the King and Polonius await Ophelia's entrance, musing whether "to be or not to be". When Ophelia enters and tries to return Hamlet's things, Hamlet accuses her of immodesty and cries "get thee to a nunnery", though it is unclear whether this, too, is a show of madness or genuine distress. His reaction convinces Claudius that Hamlet is not mad for love. Shortly thereafter, the court assembles to watch the play Hamlet has commissioned. After seeing the Player King murdered by his rival pouring poison in his ear, Claudius abruptly rises and runs from the room; for Hamlet, this is proof positive of his uncle's guilt.

Gertrude summons Hamlet to her chamber to demand an explanation. Meanwhile, Claudius talks to himself about the impossibility of repenting, since he still has possession of his ill-gotten goods: his brother's crown and wife. He sinks to his knees. On his way to visit his mother, Hamlet sneaks up behind Claudius but does not kill him, reasoning that killing Claudius while he is praying will send him straight to heaven while the ghost of Hamlet's father is stuck in purgatory. In the queen's bedchamber, Hamlet and Gertrude fight bitterly. Polonius, spying on the conversation from behind a tapestry, calls for help as Gertrude, believing Hamlet wants to kill her, calls out for help herself.

Hamlet, believing it is Claudius, stabs wildly, killing Polonius, but he pulls aside the curtain and sees his error. In a rage, Hamlet brutally insults his mother for her apparent ignorance of Claudius' villainy, but the ghost enters and reprimands Hamlet for his inaction and harsh words. Unable to see or hear the ghost herself, Gertrude takes Hamlet's conversation with it as further evidence of madness. After begging the queen to stop sleeping with Claudius, Hamlet leaves, dragging Polonius' corpse away.

Hamlet jokes with Claudius about where he has hidden Polonius' body, and the King, fearing for his life, sends Rosencrantz and Guildenstern to accompany Hamlet to England with a sealed letter to the King of England requesting that Hamlet be executed immediately.

Unhinged by grief at Polonius' death, Ophelia wanders Elsinore. Laertes arrives back from France, enraged by his father's death and his sister's madness. Claudius convinces Laertes that Hamlet is solely responsible, but a letter soon arrives indicating that Hamlet has returned to Denmark, foiling Claudius' plan. Claudius switches tactics, proposing a fencing match between Laertes and Hamlet to settle their differences. Laertes will be given a poison-tipped foil, and, if that fails, Claudius will offer Hamlet poisoned wine as a congratulation. Gertrude interrupts to report that Ophelia has drowned, though it is unclear whether it was suicide or an accident caused by her madness.

Horatio has received a letter from Hamlet, explaining that the prince escaped by negotiating with pirates who attempted to attack his England-bound ship, and the friends reunite offstage. Two gravediggers discuss Ophelia's apparent suicide while digging her grave. Hamlet arrives with Horatio and banters with one of the gravediggers, who unearths the skull of a jester from Hamlet's childhood, Yorick. Hamlet picks up the skull, saying "alas, poor Yorick" as he contemplates mortality. Ophelia's funeral procession approaches, led by Laertes. Hamlet and Horatio initially hide, but when Hamlet realizes that Ophelia is the one being buried, he reveals himself, proclaiming his love for her. Laertes and Hamlet fight by Ophelia's graveside, but the brawl is broken up.

Back at Elsinore, Hamlet explains to Horatio that he had discovered Claudius' letter with Rosencrantz and Guildenstern's belongings and replaced it with a forged copy indicating that his former friends should be killed instead of him. A foppish courtier, Osric, interrupts the conversation to deliver the fencing challenge to Hamlet, who, despite Horatio's pleas, accepts it. Hamlet does well at first, leading the match by two hits to none, and Gertrude raises a toast to him using the poisoned glass of wine Claudius had set aside for Hamlet. Claudius tries to stop her but is too late: she drinks, and Laertes realizes the plot will be revealed. Laertes slashes Hamlet with his poisoned blade. In the ensuing scuffle, they switch weapons, and Hamlet wounds Laertes with his own poisoned sword. Gertrude collapses and, claiming she has been poisoned, dies. In his dying moments, Laertes reconciles with Hamlet and reveals Claudius' plan. Hamlet rushes at Claudius and kills him. As the poison takes effect, Hamlet, hearing that Fortinbras is marching through the area, names the Norwegian prince as his successor. Horatio, distraught at the thought of being the last survivor and living whilst Hamlet does not, says he will commit suicide by drinking the dregs of Gertrude's poisoned wine, but Hamlet begs him to live on and tell his story. Hamlet dies in Horatio's arms, proclaiming "the rest is silence". Fortinbras, who was ostensibly marching towards Poland with his army, arrives at the palace, along with an English ambassador bringing news of Rosencrantz and Guildenstern's deaths. Horatio promises to recount the full story of what happened, and Fortinbras, seeing the entire Danish royal family dead, takes the crown for himself and orders a military funeral to honour Prince Hamlet.
This is done and the film ends on an image of a statue of King Hamlet being demolished.

Cast

Main characters
Kenneth Branagh as Prince Hamlet, the story's protagonist and Prince of Denmark. He is the son of the late King Hamlet and heir to the throne of Denmark. At first, Hamlet is depressed over his father's death and angered his mother Gertrude's swift remarriage to his uncle Claudius. However, Hamlet is later told by the ghost of his father that Claudius murdered him, usurping his throne. Hamlet swears to avenge his father's murder. Branagh described his interpretation of the title role as considerably less "neurotic" than others, removing the Oedipal fixation prominently featured in Laurence Olivier's 1948 film adaptation, among others. During the scenes in which Hamlet pretends to be insane, Branagh portrayed the Prince as manic.
Derek Jacobi as King Claudius, the play's antagonist and brother of the late king. He murders his brother by pouring poison into his ear while he sleeps. He then usurps his brother's title and marries his widow. At first, believing Hamlet to have been driven mad by the loss of his father, Claudius tries to spy on Hamlet. When Claudius later learns Hamlet knows of the murder, he tries to use Rosencrantz and Guildenstern, two of Hamlet's schoolmates, to have his nephew murdered. Jacobi appeared in the title role in the BBC's 1980 made-for-television version of Hamlet.
Julie Christie as Gertrude, Queen of Denmark and wife to both the late King Hamlet and King Claudius, whom she married swiftly following the former's passing—ignorant of the foul play that caused his death.
Richard Briers as Polonius, the Lord Chamberlain. An impertinent busy-body, Polonius believes Hamlet to be mad and convinces Claudius to join him in spying on the prince. Hamlet eventually kills him, believing him to be Claudius. 
Kate Winslet as Ophelia, noblewoman of Denmark and daughter of Polonius. Ophelia is in love with Hamlet, until advised by her father Polonius and brother Laertes to end their relationship. She is eventually driven mad by both Hamlet's rejection and her father's murder and drowns herself.
Nicholas Farrell as Horatio, a good friend of Hamlet whom he met while attending Wittenberg University.
Michael Maloney as Laertes, the son of Polonius and brother of Ophelia. After instructing his sister to have no further relations with Hamlet, he departs for Paris. Upon news of his father's murder, Laertes returns to Denmark, leading a mob to storm the castle. Claudius incites Laertes to kill Hamlet and avenge Polonius's death. He later conspires with Claudius to murder Hamlet during a fencing duel.
Rufus Sewell as Fortinbras, the Norwegian crown prince. Played mostly in flashback and frequently referenced throughout the film, Fortinbras storms Elsinore castle with his army during the final scene, and assumes the vacant throne of Denmark.

Supporting characters
Robin Williams as Osric, the Elsinore courtier sent by Claudius to invite Hamlet to participate in the duel with Laertes.
Gérard Depardieu as Reynaldo, a servant to Polonius. He is sent by Polonius to Paris to check up on Laertes.
Timothy Spall as Rosencrantz and Reece Dinsdale as Guildenstern, courtier friends of Hamlet who are sent by Claudius to spy on Hamlet.
Jack Lemmon as Marcellus and Ian McElhinney as Bernardo, sentries at Elsinore who alert Horatio of the appearance of King Hamlet's Ghost.
Ray Fearon as Francisco, a sentry at Elsinore and the first character to appear on screen.
Brian Blessed as the Ghost of Hamlet's Father, an apparition in the form of the late King who informs Hamlet of his murder and Claudius's usurpation of the throne.
Billy Crystal as the First Gravedigger, a sexton digging Ophelia's grave who makes a case as to why she should not receive Christian burial before making quick dialogue with Hamlet. He later presents the skull of Yorick to Hamlet, not knowing of Hamlet's history with the jester.
Simon Russell Beale as the Second Gravedigger
Don Warrington as Voltimand, an ambassador sent by King Claudius to Old King Norway.
Ravil Isyanov as Cornelius, an ambassador sent by King Claudius to Old King Norway.
Charlton Heston as the Player King
Rosemary Harris as the Player Queen
Richard Attenborough as the English Ambassador
John Gielgud as Priam, the King of Troy, played in flashback during the Player King's speech.
Judi Dench as Hecuba, the Queen of Troy and wife of Priam, played in flashback during the Player King's speech.
John Mills as Old King Norway, uncle of Fortinbras, played in flashback reprimanding his nephew for claims against Denmark.
Ken Dodd as Yorick, the King's Jester, played in flashback entertaining the royals of Elsinore during the gravediggers scene.
John Spencer-Churchill, 11th Duke of Marlborough, appears in a small cameo scene as the Norwegian Captain.

Production

Origins
Aspects of the film's staging are based on Adrian Noble's recent Royal Shakespeare Company production of the play, in which Branagh had played the title role.

Text
The film uses a conflated text based on the 1623 First Folio, with additions from the Second Quarto and amendments from other sources. According to a note appended to the published screenplay:

Style
Despite using a full text, Branagh's film is also very visual; it makes frequent use of flashbacks to depict scenes that are either only described but not performed in Shakespeare's text, such as Hamlet's childhood friendship with Yorick, or scenes only implied by the play's text, such as Hamlet's sexual relationship with Ophelia. The film also uses very long single takes for numerous scenes.

In a radical departure from previous Hamlet films, Branagh set the internal scenes in a vibrantly colourful setting, featuring a throne room dominated by mirrored doors; film scholar Samuel Crowl calls the setting "film noir with all the lights on". Branagh chose Victorian era costuming and furnishings, using Blenheim Palace, built in the early 18th century, as Elsinore Castle for the external scenes. Harry Keyishan has suggested that the film is structured as an epic, courting comparison with Ben-Hur, The Ten Commandments and Doctor Zhivago. As J. Lawrence Guntner points out, comparisons with the latter film are heightened by the presence of Julie Christie (Zhivago Lara) as Gertrude.

Filming
Hamlet was shot in Panavision Super 70 by Alex Thomson. It was the last feature film to be entirely shot in 70 mm until production of Samsara in 2011. Branagh was among the very few to use 65mm film cameras after that, on his 2017 film Murder on the Orient Express. The filming was done from 25 January to 12 April 1996.

Music

The score to Hamlet was composed and co-produced by frequent Kenneth Branagh collaborator Patrick Doyle and conducted by Robert Ziegler. Doyle composed three primary themes for the film to accompany the characters of Ophelia, Claudius, and Hamlet, which are varied throughout the score. The "simple, childlike" theme for Ophelia is mostly string-dominant, often performed by a string quartet yet occasionally accompanied by a full string ensemble or mixed chorus. For Claudius, Doyle composed a theme in the form of a demented canon, using more 20th century harmonies. The theme for Hamlet was considered by Doyle to be "the most daunting and elusive" to conceive, before settling upon a more "simple" motif to accompany the contemplative character.

The soundtrack was released 10 December 1996 through Sony Classical Records and features 26 tracks of score at a running time of over 76 minutes. For his work on the film, Doyle received an Academy Award nomination for Best Original Score.

 In Pace (3:07) – performed by Plácido Domingo (this is heard in the film during the closing credits)
 Fanfare (0:48)
 "All that lives must die" (2:40)
 "To thine own self be true" (3:04)
 The Ghost (9:55)
 "Give me up the truth" (1:05)
 "What a piece of work is a man" (1:50)
 "What players are they" (1:33)
 "Out out thou strumpet fortune" (3:11)
 "To be, or not to be" (1:53)
 "I loved you once" (3:27)
 "Oh, what a noble mind" (2:41)
 "If once a widow" (3:36)
 "Now could I drink hot blood" (6:57)
 "A foolish prating nave" (1:05)
 "Oh heavy deed" (0:56)
 "Oh here they come" (4:39)
 "My thoughts be bloody" (2:52)
 "The doors are broke" (1:20)
 "And will 'a not come again?" (1:59)
 "Alas poor Yorick" (2:49)
 "Sweets to the sweet – farewell" (4:39)
 "Give me your pardon sir" (1:24)
 "Part them they are incensed" (1:47)
 "Goodnight, sweet prince" (3:36)
 "Go bid the soldiers shoot" (2:52)

Release
Hamlet was screened out of competition at the 1997 Cannes Film Festival. A shorter edit of the Branagh film, approximately two-and-a-half hours long, was also shown in some markets.

Home media
A 2-Disc DVD was released in the US and Canada on 14 August 2007. It includes a full-length commentary by Branagh and Shakespeare scholar Russell Jackson. A Blu-ray Disc was released on 17 August 2010 in the US and Canada with similar additional features, including an introduction by Kenneth Branagh, the featurette "To Be on Camera: A History with Hamlet", the 1996 Cannes Film Festival Promo, and a Shakespeare Movies Trailer Gallery.

Reception

Box office
Hamlet was not a success at the box office, mostly due to its limited release. The film earned just over $90,000 in its opening weekend playing on three screens. It made just over $30,000 in the Czech Republic, over $545,000 in Spain and ultimately played on fewer than 100 screens in the United States, bringing its total gross to just under $5 million on a budget of $18 million.

Critical response
Hamlet received positive reviews. It currently holds a 95% rating at Rotten Tomatoes with the consensus, "Kenneth Branagh's sprawling, finely textured adaptation of Shakespeare's masterpiece lives up to its source material, using strong performances and a sharp cinematic focus to create a powerfully resonant film that wastes none of its 246 minutes."

Roger Ebert, film critic of the Chicago Sun-Times, awarded the film four stars, comparing it to Laurence Olivier's lauded 1948 version, stating, "Branagh's Hamlet lacks the narcissistic intensity of Laurence Olivier's (in the 1948 Academy Award winner), but the film as a whole is better, placing Hamlet in the larger context of royal politics, and making him less a subject for pity." Janet Maslin of The New York Times also praised both Branagh's direction and performance, writing, "This Hamlet, like Branagh's version of Much Ado About Nothing, takes a frank, try-anything approach to sustaining its entertainment value, but its gambits are most often evidence of Branagh's solid showmanship. His own performance is the best evidence of all." The New York Review of Books praised the attention given to Shakespeare's language, "giving the meter of the verse a musician's respect"; Branagh himself said his aim was "telling the story with utmost clarity and simplicity".

Some critics, notably Stanley Kauffmann, declared the film to be the finest motion picture version of Hamlet yet made. Online film critic James Berardinelli wrote the film a four star review and declared the Branagh Hamlet the finest Shakespeare adaptation ever, rating it as the best film of 1996, the fourth best film of the 90s, and one of his top 101 favourite films of all time, saying, "From the moment it was first announced that Branagh would attempt an unabridged Hamlet, I never doubted that it would be a worthy effort ... I have seen dozens of versions of this play, and none has ever held me in such a grip of awe".

The film did have its detractors, however, with Lloyd Rose of The Washington Post calling it "the film equivalent of a lushly illustrated coffee-table book" and Desson Thomson writing of Branagh's performance: "the choices he makes are usually overextended. When it's time to be funny, he skitters over the top. When he's sad or touched, he makes a mechanical, catching noise in his throat." John Simon called Branagh's performance "brawny" and "not easy to like" and said that Branagh's direction used "explicitness where Shakespeare ... settled for subtlety or mere suggestion". Leonard Maltin, who gave the film a positive three stars in his Movie and Video Guide (and gave the Olivier version of Hamlet four stars), praised the cinematography by Alex Thomson, but stated that "Branagh essentially gives a stage performance that is nearly as over-the-top as some of his directorial touches."

Kenneth Branagh's Hamlet ranks No. 3 on Rotten Tomatoes list of Greatest Shakespeare Movies, just behind Akira Kurosawa's Ran (1985, based on King Lear), which ranks in second place, and Branagh's own Henry V (1989), which ranks in first place.

Accolades

Game 
A spin-off game entitled Hamlet: A Murder Mystery, directed by historian Jean-Pierre Isbouts, was a co-production between Pantheon and Castle Rock-Entertainment. Also produced in 1996, this was arguably the first video game based on a Shakespeare work. This CD-ROM is divided into two parts titled: "To be" (where players can play Hamlet in the narrative) and "Not to be" (where players can read the texts). In gameplay, players wander through the castle trying to locate the killer. The game combines material from the film with original footage, animation, and games and puzzles.

Galley Cat deemed it "The Hamlet Video Game That Time Forgot". Shakespeare Studies, Volume 38 thought the game shows film's potential as a middle ground for digital works by offering a sound narrative that can be manipulated by player choices. "Shakespeare's Hamlet In An Era of Textual Exhaustion" felt the game offered a reworking of the plot that gave the player agency and a sense of immersion. Quandary praised the game for its multi-layered nature and its packaging.

See also
Hamlet in performance
Hamlet on screen

References

 Maric, Jasminka, "Filozofija u Hamletu", Alfa BK Univerzitet, Beograd, 2015.
 Maric, Jasminka, "Philosophy in Hamlet", author's edition, Belgrade, 2018.

External links
 
 
 
 

1996 films
1996 drama films
American films based on plays
American drama films
British drama films
British films based on plays
British romantic drama films
Castle Rock Entertainment films
Columbia Pictures films
Films directed by Kenneth Branagh
American films about revenge
British films about revenge
British ghost films
Films based on Hamlet
Films set in the 19th century
Films scored by Patrick Doyle
Films produced by David Barron
Films shot at Shepperton Studios
Films about death
Films about murder
Fratricide in fiction
Poisoning in film
Films set in castles
1990s English-language films
1990s American films
1990s British films